Grimminghausen may refer to:

Grimminghausen (Plettenberg), a village in Germany
Grimminghausen (Schmallenberg), a village in Germany